Akilan Pari (born 20 July 1989) is an Indian professional basketball player.  He currently plays for the Punjab Steelers of India's UBA Pro Basketball League. 

He is a member of India's national basketball team since 2014. As of 2018, he serves as team captain of India's national basketball team.

Pari already made a name for himself as a youth player. He captained Tamil Nadu's official state lineups for the u-13, u-16 and u-18 (junior) and senior men level.

During the 2013 NBA All-Star Game, Akila Pari was selected to play at the Sprite Uncontainable Game, where he was coached by Omri Casspi and Serge Ibaka.

As of 2018, he has been labelled as one of India's best basketball players because of his passing and ball handling skills, and because of complicated engagement rules, missed a crucial playoff game against Lebanon, a game which India lost because of his absence.

References

External links
 Akilan Pari at 2019 FIBA World Cup Qualification
 
 Akilan Pari at 2016 FIBA Asia Challenge
 Akilan Pari at SportingIndia.com
 Akilan Pari at Asia-basket.com
 Akilan Pari at FIBA Archive
 Akilan Pari at REAL GM

1989 births
Living people
Basketball players from Tamil Nadu
Sportspeople from Chennai
Indian men's basketball players
Point guards
Basketball players at the 2014 Asian Games
Asian Games competitors for India